James Pettigrew may refer to:

 James Bell Pettigrew (1832–1908), Scottish anatomist and amateur naturalist, aviation pioneer and museum curator
 J. Johnston Pettigrew (1828–1863), American author, lawyer, linguist, diplomat, and soldier
SS James J. Pettigrew, a Liberty ship
 Jim Pettigrew (born 1958), chairman of CYBG PLC